Misled may refer to:
 "Misled" (Celine Dion song)
 "Misled" (Kool & the Gang song)